Only four National Basketball Association (NBA) games have ever been played outdoors. The first outdoor game was played between the Phoenix Suns and the Milwaukee Bucks on September 24, 1972 at Hiram Bithorn Stadium, a baseball park in San Juan, Puerto Rico, during that year's preseason. The Suns defeated the Bucks, 116–103.

The NBA did not schedule another outdoor game after that, citing weather as a major obstacle. However, in 2008, the Phoenix Suns planned to play a preseason game outdoors at the Indian Wells Tennis Garden in Indian Wells, California. The idea reportedly came from Suns part-owner Dick Heckmann, who presented it to Suns president and CEO Rick Welts. The game was played at the tennis arena on October 11, 2008, between the Suns and the Denver Nuggets. Both teams, affected by low temperature (around ) and high wind (at ), struggled from the field as they shot below 40 percent and hit only 3 out of 27 from the three-point line. Key players, including Carmelo Anthony, Allen Iverson, and Amar'e Stoudemire, missed the game due to injury. In the end, the Nuggets defeated the Suns, 77–72.

Due to the success of the 2008 game, the Suns decided to schedule more outdoor games in upcoming preseasons. On October 10, 2009, the Suns met the Golden State Warriors at Indian Wells. Due to poor weather, both teams struggled to find the basket as they shot just above 40 percent. Warriors' Anthony Morrow had the game high 30 points, while Channing Frye led the Suns with 16 points. The Warriors won the game 104–101.

A third game at Indian Wells was played on October 9, 2010, between the Suns and the Dallas Mavericks. Unlike the previous games, the weather was warm and windless. The Suns won for the first time, defeating the Mavericks 98–90. Five Suns players scored in double figures; Grant Hill led with 16. J. J. Barea had 13 to lead the Mavericks. Dirk Nowitzki sat out the game.

All modern outdoor games were televised on TNT. The WNBA has had one regular season game played outside, the Liberty Outdoor Classic, held at Arthur Ashe Stadium in Flushing, New York on July 19, 2008.

References

Outdoor games
Outdoor games
Women's National Basketball Association